Herbert Henry Davis Peirce (May 11, 1849 – December 5, 1916) was a United States diplomat who served as Third Assistant Secretary of State from 1901 to 1906 and as U.S. Ambassador to Norway  from 1906 to 1911. He is the brother of the philosopher Charles S. Peirce.

Biography
Herbert Henry Davis Peirce was born in Cambridge, Massachusetts, on May 11, 1849, the son of Benjamin Peirce and his wife Sarah, who was a daughter of Elijah H. Mills. He was educated at Harvard College, graduating in 1871.  He later studied at the Royal School of Mines in London.

In this capacity, he attended the coronation of Nicholas II of Russia in 1896.

In 1901, president Theodore Roosevelt named Peirce to be Third Assistant Secretary of State and Peirce held this office from November 16, 1901, until June 22, 1906. In this capacity, he made arrangements for the 1905 conference in Portsmouth, New Hampshire, between the Russian Empire and the Empire of Japan at the end of the Russo-Japanese War that resulted in the Treaty of Portsmouth.

President then named Peirce U.S. Minister to Norway. Ambassador Peirce presented his credentials on August 13, 1906, and served there until May 30, 1911.

Peirce retired from the Diplomatic Corps in 1912. He then served as counsel to the United States in American and British claims arbitration.

Peirce died in Portland, Maine, on December 5, 1916.

References

"Herbert H. D. Peirce Dead; Ex-Minister to Norway Was Long in the Diplomatic Service", New York Times, Dec. 5, 1916

1849 births
1916 deaths
United States Assistant Secretaries of State
People from Cambridge, Massachusetts
Harvard College alumni
Ambassadors of the United States to Norway